Austropyrgus tumidus is a species of minute freshwater snail with an operculum, an aquatic gastropod mollusc or micromollusc in the Hydrobiidae family. This species is endemic to western Victoria, Australia. It is known from a few small springs and streams that flow into the lower part of the Glenelg River.

See also 
 List of non-marine molluscs of Australia

References

Further reading

External links

Hydrobiidae
Austropyrgus
Endemic fauna of Australia
Gastropods of Australia
Gastropods described in 2003